Shejari Shejari Pakke Shejari is an Indian Marathi-language television series which aired on Zee Marathi. It starred Vaibhav Mangle and Anand Ingale in lead roles.

Cast

Main 
 Anand Ingale as Ballal Lambodar Pathak
 Vaibhav Mangle as Brijlal Pathak (Birju)

Recurring 
Ballal's family
 Sulekha Talwalkar as Yamini Ballal Pathak
 Mandar Kulkarni as Moraya Ballal Pathak
 Vidyadhar Joshi as Ashwin

Birju's family
 Vishakha Subhedar as Lajwanti Brijlal Pathak (Lajjo)
 Shivani Rangole as Mahua Brijlal Pathak
 Priyadarshan Jadhav as Bhujang
 Manasi Kulkarni as Harini

Others
 Kishor Pradhan as Bapu Damle
 Vijay Kadam as Mr. Ashtaputre
 Rupali Bhosale as Monika Ghadge
 Bharat Ganeshpure as Popatrao Landge
 Shashikant Kerkar as Baluchi
 Prabhakar More as Suhas Parab

Awards

Airing history

References

External links 
 
 

Marathi-language television shows
Zee Marathi original programming
2013 Indian television series debuts
2014 Indian television series endings